Yachts and Hearts, or The Opium Smugglers is a 1918 Australian silent film about opium smugglers in Sydney.

It is considered a lost film.

Plot
Opium smugglers work in Sydney. There is a car chase which ends in a crash, a cabaret which turns into a church, a yacht race in Sydney harbour, and 40 bathing beauties.

According to one contemporary report the film consisted of "5 heart throbbing acts, wholly and solely produced in Australia by Antipodes Films. See the great motor smash, police raid on gambling saloon, and a girl's thrilling biplane flight over Sydney."

Cast
Beryl Clifton as Ella Deane
Chris Olsen as Maurice Dean
Arthur Spence as detective
Clare St Clair as Mrs Friedman
Billie Monckton as crippled boy
Edith Clarke
Vera Chamberlain
Melville Stevenson
Dorothy and Lola Campbell
David Edelsten
Marjorie Sergeant

Production
This was the second movie from Antipodes Films, who had previously made A Romance of Burke and Wills Expedition of 1860. The movie was shot in January 1918.

Release
The film seems to have made little impact. It played as a support feature in some cinemas.

Antipodes made no more movies.

References

External links
 
 Yachts and Hearts, or The Opium Smugglers at National Film and Sound Archive

Australian black-and-white films
Lost Australian films
1918 films
1918 drama films
Australian drama films
Australian silent feature films
1918 lost films
Lost drama films
Films about opium
Silent drama films